The Liberation of Skopje can refer to:

 The Liberation of Skopje (1981 film), a 1981 Australian film
 The Liberation of Skopje (2016 film), a 2016 Macedonian film

See also 
 Stratsin-Kumanovo operation